Werner Dössegger (born 18 February 1938) is a Swiss long-distance runner. He competed in the men's 10,000 metres at the 1972 Summer Olympics.

References

1938 births
Living people
Athletes (track and field) at the 1972 Summer Olympics
Swiss male long-distance runners
Olympic athletes of Switzerland
Place of birth missing (living people)